= Batik Tribe =

Hip hop group

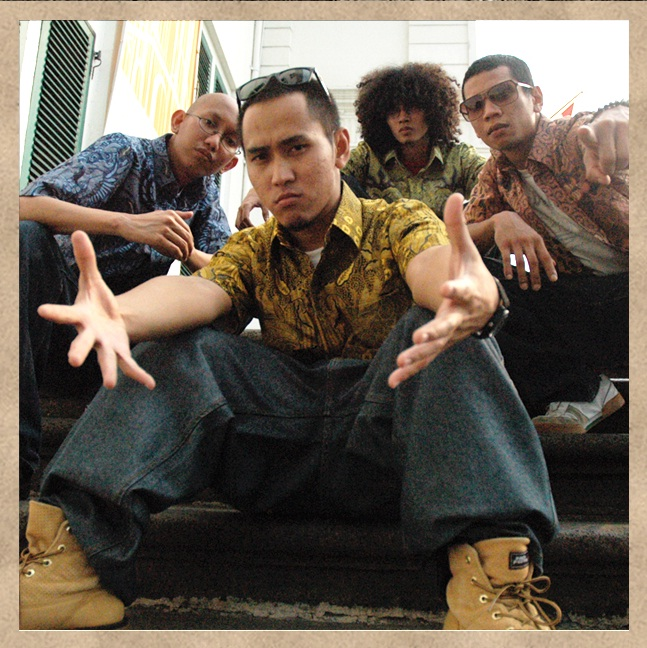
- Batik Tribe in 2012

Background information
- Also known as: B-Tribe
- Origin: Jakarta, Indonesia
- Genres: Alternative hip hop Traditional hip hop
- Years active: 2007 - present
- Label: Nyos Records
- Members: DJ S-Tea; Della MC; Wizzow; Cool B
- Website: http://www.myspace.com/batiktribe

Batik Tribe is a hip hop band that started at the beginning of 2007. Batik Tribe is composed of Della MC (havis), who helps for the shout, while Saykoji raps, Cool B (budi) is a dancer who often accompany some Indonesian celebrities, Wizzow (Wisnu) is a reliable music producer in Indonesia, and DJ S-tea (sonu) who has experience and who also created a hip hop band in Australia.

When Batik Tribe released its first album "melangkah" in 2008, members of the band agreed to produce it and distribute only 2,000 CD's and 1,000 cassettes, using the services of record label medium (Virgo Ramayana Record).

Surviving the music industry in Indonesia has become a struggle for Batik Tribe.

The first single from their album "Melangkah" titled "Sabarlah"(Be patient) is dedicated to the children who live on the street.

== Discography ==
=== Album ===
- 2008 : Melangkah through Virgo Ramayana Records
- 2010 : Currently recording the album
